Caladenia oenochila, commonly known as the red-lipped spider orchid, or wine-lipped spider orchid, is a plant in the orchid family Orchidaceae and is endemic to Victoria, Australia. It is a ground orchid with a single leaf and usually only one pale yellow-green flower with purple marks and a dark red labellum.

Description
Caladenia oenochila is a terrestrial, perennial, deciduous, herb with a spherical underground tuber. The flowers are pale yellow-green flowers with purple stripes or blotches. The sepals and petals are broad near their bases then suddenly taper to long, thin, reddish, glandular tips. There are four or six well-spaced rows of calli along its mid-line. Flowering occurs in August and September and is more prolific after summer bushfire.

Taxonomy and naming
Caladenia oenochila  was first formally described in 1991 by Geoffrey Carr from a specimen collected near Officer and the description was published in Indigenous Flora and Fauna Association Miscellaneous Paper 1. The specific epithet (oenochila) is derived from the Ancient Greek words οἶνος oinos meaning "wine" and χεῖλος cheilos meaning "lip" or "rim".

Distribution and habitat
The red-lipped spider orchid is mostly found in the southern foothills of the Great Dividing Range where it grows in shaded places in forest or woodland.

Conservation
Caladenia oenochila  is listed as  "vulnerable" under the Victorian Flora and Fauna Guarantee Act 1988.

References

oenochila
Plants described in 1991
Endemic orchids of Australia
Orchids of Victoria (Australia)